The 1999 MBNA Gold 400 was the 27th stock car race of the 1999 NASCAR Winston Cup Series season and the 31st iteration of the event. The race was held on Sunday, September 26, 1999, in Dover, Delaware at Dover International Speedway, a 1-mile (1.6 km) permanent oval-shaped racetrack. The race took the scheduled 400 laps to complete. Roush Racing driver Mark Martin would manage to dominate the late stages of the race from lap 349 to take his 31st career NASCAR Winston Cup Series victory and his second and final victory of the season. To fill out the podium, Joe Gibbs Racing driver Tony Stewart and Robert Yates Racing driver Dale Jarrett would finish second and third, respectively.

Background 

Dover International Speedway is an oval race track in Dover, Delaware, United States that has held at least two NASCAR races since it opened in 1969. In addition to NASCAR, the track also hosted USAC and the NTT IndyCar Series. The track features one layout, a 1-mile (1.6 km) concrete oval, with 24° banking in the turns and 9° banking on the straights. The speedway is owned and operated by Dover Motorsports.

The track, nicknamed "The Monster Mile", was built in 1969 by Melvin Joseph of Melvin L. Joseph Construction Company, Inc., with an asphalt surface, but was replaced with concrete in 1995. Six years later in 2001, the track's capacity moved to 135,000 seats, making the track have the largest capacity of sports venue in the mid-Atlantic. In 2002, the name changed to Dover International Speedway from Dover Downs International Speedway after Dover Downs Gaming and Entertainment split, making Dover Motorsports. From 2007 to 2009, the speedway worked on an improvement project called "The Monster Makeover", which expanded facilities at the track and beautified the track. After the 2014 season, the track's capacity was reduced to 95,500 seats.

Entry list 

 (R) denotes rookie driver.

Practice

First practice 
The first practice session was held on Friday, September 24, at 11:00 AM EST. The session would last for one hour and 30 minutes.

Second practice 
The second practice session was held on Friday, September 24, at 1:20 PM EST. The session would last for 40 minutes.

Third practice 
The third practice session was held on Saturday, September 25, at 9:30 AM EST. The session would last for one hour and 15 minutes.

Final practice 
The final practice session, sometimes referred to as Happy Hour, was held on Saturday, July 24, after the preliminary 1999 MBNA Gold 200. The session would last for one hour.

Qualifying 
Qualifying was split into two rounds. The first round was held on Friday, September 24, at 3:30 PM EST. Each driver would have one lap to set a time. During the first round, the top 25 drivers in the round would be guaranteed a starting spot in the race. If a driver was not able to guarantee a spot in the first round, they had the option to scrub their time from the first round and try and run a faster lap time in a second round qualifying run, held on Saturday, September 25, at 11:30 AM EST. As with the first round, each driver would have one lap to set a time. Positions 26-36 would be decided on time, while positions 37-43 would be based on provisionals. Six spots are awarded by the use of provisionals based on owner's points. The seventh is awarded to a past champion who has not otherwise qualified for the race. If no past champion needs the provisional, the next team in the owner points will be awarded a provisional.

Five drivers would fail to qualify: Dick Trickle, Todd Bodine, Darrell Waltrip, Derrike Cope, and Andy Belmont.

Full qualifying results

Race results

References 

1999 NASCAR Winston Cup Series
NASCAR races at Dover Motor Speedway
September 1999 sports events in the United States
1999 in sports in Delaware